George Jessup was a British boxer. He competed in the men's lightweight event at the 1908 Summer Olympics.

References

Year of birth missing
Year of death missing
British male boxers
Olympic boxers of Great Britain
Boxers at the 1908 Summer Olympics
Place of birth missing
Lightweight boxers